Geoffrey Alan "Geoff" Bouchard (born 5 September 1948) is a British former motorcycle speedway rider.

Biography
Geoff Bouchard was born in Leicester in 1948. After initially competing in trials and sidecar racing, he took up speedway in 1969 at Long Eaton, and broke into the Long Eaton team in 1970, riding in the second tier of the British League. By 1971 his average rose to over 8 points, his performances getting him rides in the top division for Cradley Heathens, Wolverhampton Wolves, Leicester Lions, Reading Racers, and Swindon Robins between 1971 and 1973. He made the Swindon team for 9 matches in each of the 1973 and 1974 seasons, and became a full-time Swindon rider in 1975, averaging 4.12 from 34 matches. He stayed at Swindon until 1979, becoming a consistent second-string scorer.

He was included in the Young England team on several occasions between 1971 and 1974, and competed in the Second Division Riders Final in 1973 and 1974, finishing 5th in the latter.

Bouchard retired from racing in 1979 after suffering a punctured lung in an accident at Leicester. He then acted as machine examiner at Leicester Stadium until speedway closed down in Leicester in 1983.

References

1948 births
Living people
British speedway riders
English motorcycle racers
Sportspeople from Leicester
Long Eaton Archers riders
Cradley Heathens riders
Wolverhampton Wolves riders
Leicester Lions riders
Reading Racers riders
Swindon Robins riders